Kundo: Age of the Rampant is a 2014 South Korean period action film starring Ha Jung-woo and Gang Dong-won, and directed by Yoon Jong-bin. Set in mid-19th century Joseon, it is about a power struggle between the unjust wealthy noblemen who run society and a group of righteous outlaws who steal from corrupt officials to give to the downtrodden and starving.

Plot
The year is 1862. The late Joseon dynasty was a period of social and economic unrest in Korea, and it was also a time of great tyranny. Due to continuous natural disasters and poor harvests, poverty, hunger and death are rampant. The aristocracy rule the country and, concerned only with their own wealth, they exploit and persecute the poor.

In these turbulent times, a band of fighters named Kundo rise against the authorities. They raid corrupt officials, then share their loot with the vulnerable and impoverished. While the king stands powerless against them, Kundo becomes a figure of fear to undeserving nobles, and a ray of hope in the lives of long-suffering citizens. The members of Kundo believe that their cause is more important than their own lives.

In an era when one's status is decided by birth, Dolmuchi was born to a poor butcher, while Jo Yoon, though born into a powerful and wealthy family, is illegitimate. The two men strike a dangerous deal and Dolmuchi loses his mother and sister as a result. He is trampled by Jo Yoon who commands absolute power in his oppressive world. Bringing together the men who are on the fringes of this dark society, Dolmuchi is accepted as a member of Kundo and opens his eyes to the world. Reborn under the new name "Dolchi," he draws his sword out of its sheath and disperses the shadow cast on the poor and helpless. Then before him, the man who took away his family appears. Standing in front of Jo Yoon, Dolchi challenges his arch-enemy to a final duel.

Cast

Ha Jung-woo as Dolmuchi/Dolchi, a former butcher (an occupation which was in the cheonmin caste) who joins a makeshift band of outlaws to avenge the deaths of his family members.
Gang Dong-won as Jo Yoon, a nobleman's son who is gifted in martial arts, but he has no rights as his mother was only a concubine and his father refuses to acknowledge him.
Lee Geung-young as Ttaeng-choo, mood-maker of the band
Lee Sung-min as Dae-ho, leader of the band
Cho Jin-woong as Lee Tae-ki, a thief who used to be an aristocrat
Ma Dong-seok as Tianbao
Yoon Ji-hye as Ma-hyang
Joo Jin-mo as Song Young-gil
Song Young-chang as Jo Won-sook
Jung Man-sik as Butler Yang
Kim Byeong-ok as Toposa
Kim Jong-gu as Choi Hyun-ki
Kim Sung-kyun as Jang
Kang Hyun-joong as Park
Kim Jae-young as Geum-san
Jung Yi-seo as Si-ra
Im Hyeon-seong as Yeom-tong
 Lee David as Jo Seo-in
Woo Jeong-guk as Citizen 1
Choe Yeong-do as Citizen 2
Park Myung-shin as Choi's wife
Cho Seon-mook as Foreigner
Kim Sam-il as Jang's father
Noh Gang-min as young Lee
Eom Ji-seong as Joong-man-yi
Nam Da-reum as young Jo Yoon
Jang Woo-jin as Warehouse constable 1
Park Song-taek as Warehouse constable 2
Yeon Jun-won as Kundo 1
Eom Ji-man as Kundo 2
Kim Tae-su as Jo Yoon's slave 1
Yoon Kyung-ho as Jo Yoon's slave 2
Ri Min as Tribute government official
Heo Ji-hye as Former gisaeng
Jeon Seong-ae as Former midwife
Jeong Dae-yong as Oksa elder
Kim Hae-sook as Dolmuchi's mother
Han Ye-ri as Gok-ji

Box office
Kundo: Age of the Rampant drew 551,848 viewers on its first day in theaters on July 23, 2014, grossing  (or ). This was the all-time highest opening day box office in South Korea, for both a foreign and domestic film, breaking previous records set by Transformers: Dark of the Moon (2011) and Secretly, Greatly (2013) (Kundo'''s record would shortly be broken eight days later by The Admiral: Roaring Currents''. It reached 3.1 million viewers in five days.

Awards and nominations

References

External links
  
 
 
 

2010s historical action films
2014 action drama films
South Korean action drama films
Films set in the Joseon dynasty
Films directed by Yoon Jong-bin
2010s Korean-language films
South Korean films about revenge
South Korean historical action films
2010s South Korean films